The 1975 are an English pop rock band formed in 2002 in Wilmslow, Cheshire. Now based in Manchester, the band consists of lead vocalist and rhythm guitarist Matthew "Matty" Healy, lead guitarist Adam Hann, bassist Ross MacDonald, and drummer George Daniel.

The band members met in secondary school and performed together as teenagers. Gigs, organised by a council worker, led the band to sign with Dirty Hit and Polydor Records. They opened for several major acts and released a series of extended plays (Facedown, Sex, Music for Cars, IV) from 2012–13, before releasing their UK chart-topping self-titled debut album (2013), which includes the popular singles "Sex", "Chocolate", and "Robbers".

Their second album, I Like It When You Sleep, for You Are So Beautiful yet So Unaware of It (2016), reached No. 1 in the UK, US, Canada, Australia and New Zealand. The band had further UK no 1 albums with the acclaimed A Brief Inquiry into Online Relationships (2018), Notes on a Conditional Form (2020) and Being Funny in a Foreign Language (2022).

History

2002–2011: Formation

Matty Healy, the son of actors Tim Healy and Denise Welch, was born in London and grew up in his parents' home city of Newcastle before moving to Wilmslow. He met Ross MacDonald, Adam Hann, and George Daniel at Wilmslow High School in 2002, and they played together as teenagers. The band formed when the local council worker organised numerous gigs for teens. Healy found Hann who "said he wanted to play one of these shows". The band began playing covers until they eventually wrote their own music. According to Healy, "We started from then and we've been making music together since we were about 13." After Hann invited the members to form a band, they passed their early days covering punk songs in a local club. Healy was originally the drummer but took over lead vocals after frontman Elliot Williams left to start another band; Williams would later join Editors on keyboards and backing vocals. George Daniel was recruited as the new drummer to complete the final line-up.

Before settling on The 1975, the band performed under multiple names including Me and You Versus Them, Those 1975s, Forever Drawing Six, Talkhouse, the Slowdown, Bigsleep, and Drive Like I Do. Healy recounted that the final name was inspired by "deranged and mental" scribblings found on the back page of the book On the Road by Jack Kerouac that were dated "1 June, The 1975".

2012–2014: Early career and self-titled debut album
The band's self-titled debut album was recorded with Arctic Monkeys collaborator Mike Crossey. Between Autumn 2012 and Spring 2013, during which time the album was recorded, the band released four EPs. They toured to support and build momentum for the album, including numerous gigs and special appearances with other artists.

The album received positive reviews from critics, and topped the UK Albums Chart on 8 September. As of March 2016, it had sold 410,981 copies in the UK, and 390,000 copies in the US.

The release of the band's first EP, titled Facedown, in August 2012 saw the band's first UK airplay on national radio with lead track "The City", which was also featured as part of a BBC Introducing show with Huw Stephens on BBC Radio 1. The 1975 once again garnered national radio attention in late 2012, with BBC Radio 1 DJ Zane Lowe championing their single "Sex" from the eponymous EP, which was released on 19 November. They embarked on a United Kingdom and Ireland tour extended into early 2013, before beginning a US tour in Spring 2014. Upon the release of Music for Cars on 4 March 2013, the 1975 found mainstream chart success with "Chocolate", reaching number 19 in the UK Singles Chart. On 20 May 2013 the band released IV, which included a new version of "The City". The track charted in UK and received airplay in several other countries.

The 1975 toured extensively to support releases and to build hype before releasing their debut. The band supported Muse on the second leg of The 2nd Law World Tour at the Emirates Stadium in London on 26 May 2013. They also toured with the Neighbourhood in the United States in June 2013, and supported the Rolling Stones in Hyde Park on 13 July. In August, the band performed on the Festival Republic Stage at 2013 Reading and Leeds Festivals.

In a feature article, Elliot Mitchell of When the Gramophone Rings wrote that releasing a string of EPs before the debut album was "a move that he deemed necessary to provide context to the band's broad sound, rather than just building up with singles alone." Healy said, "We wouldn't have been able to release the album without putting out the EP's first, as we wanted to make sure we could express ourselves properly before dropping this long, ambitious debut record on people."

Their self-titled debut, The 1975, was released on 2 September 2013, co-produced by Mike Crossey, known for his work with Arctic Monkeys and Foals. The 1975 were selling out shows even before the debut of their full-length album as Healy recalled in an interview with Larry Heath of The AU Review. The lead single was a re-worked "Sex", which was released on 26 August 2013. The song premiered on Zane Lowe's BBC Radio 1 show on 8 July 2013, and a music video premiered on YouTube on 26 July. The 1975 debuted at number one on the UK Albums Chart.

The 1975 toured in the UK in September 2013, among others performing in Kingston upon Hull as headliners at Freedom Festival, a celebration of the city's shortlisting for 2017 UK City of Culture designation, and at iTunes Festival on 8 September as an opening act for indie electronic quartet Bastille. The band undertook a North American tour in October, a European for November, and in January 2014 the band performed in New Zealand and Australia. In September 2013, the band performed three sold-out shows at London's Shepherd's Bush Empire. In April 2014, the band performed for the first time in a major American music and arts festival: Coachella. The band played at Royal Albert Hall the same month. In May, the band's recorded output was distributed digitally while they were touring North America. Healy noted that the band had recording scheduled in Q2 2015.

2015–2017: I Like It When You Sleep, for You Are So Beautiful yet So Unaware of It
On 1 June 2015, the band's social accounts were terminated, which caused intense speculation. A comic strip was posted on Healy's Twitter a day prior but was later posted on their manager's (Jamie Oborne) account, which suggested the band's break-up. The next day, the accounts were reinstated, but the cover images and profile photos were white and light pink, instead of the usual black and white, revealing it to be a publicity stunt.

On 8 October, the band announced their second album, I Like It When You Sleep, for You Are So Beautiful yet So Unaware of It. They premiered the lead single, "Love Me", simultaneously scheduling a support tour in Europe, North America, and Asia. They premiered the second single, "UGH!", on 10 December on Beats 1. The album's third single, "The Sound" debuted on BBC Radio 1 on 14 January 2016. The 1975 released the fourth single "Somebody Else" on 15 February on Beats 1 before the album's release. "A Change of Heart" premiered on Radio 1 on 22 February, four days prior to the album's release.

NME, who had previously been highly critical of the band, praised the album for its scope and ambition, writing that "Any record that burrows as deep into your psyche as ‘I Like It…' should be considered essential. It's hugely clever and wryly funny, too." They later named it their Album of the Year for 2016. Although music journalist Alexis Petridis noted that parts of the album were over-ambitious, he went on to claim that "incredibly, though, most of the time Healy gets away with it. That's sometimes because his observations are sharp — as a skewering of celebrity squad culture, 'you look famous, let's be friends / And portray we possess something important / And do the things we like' is pretty acute — but more usually because they come loaded with witty self-awareness and deprecation: the endless depictions of vacuous, coke-numbed girls he has met would get wearying were it not for the fact that he keeps turning the lyrical crosshair on himself." In a more mixed review, Rolling Stone criticised tracks like "Lostmyhead" and "Please Be Naked" for being "boring-melty" but praised songs such as "Somebody Else," "Loving Someone" and "Love Me".

The album was released on 26 February and topped the UK Albums Chart and the US Billboard 200. The band released a free download for "How to Draw" on Twitter and through Target Exclusive. It was shortlisted for the 2016 Mercury Music Prize and nominated for Album of the Year at the 2017 Brit Awards.

2017–2019: A Brief Inquiry into Online Relationships 
On 13 November 2016, member George Daniel teased the band's third album by releasing a video on his Instagram account captioned "2018", containing snippets of audio along with Healy playing the keyboards.

On 3 April 2017, Healy tweeted "I like it when you sleep is coming to an end" (sic) before following up with "Music for Cars", which shares the name of their third extended play. In March 2017, the band confirmed that two songs for the new album have already been written. In June, Healy also confirmed that Drive Like I Do, one of the 1975's prior incarnations, will release a debut album as a side project 'in a few years'.

In November, Healy teased the release of an EP within 2017. Besides being confirmed, the EP was delayed to 2018, with manager Jamie Oborne stating that "something" would be released instead; this was the band's debut live album, DH00278. He also confirmed that no singles from Music for Cars will be released in 2017, with the band confirming that something will be released on 1 June 2018.

In March 2018, the band deleted many media posts across their accounts going back to July 2017, during their final show at Latitude Festival for I Like It When You Sleep, for You Are So Beautiful yet So Unaware of It. On 22 April 2018, in response to a fan comment on Twitter, Oborne stated that their second album's campaign would remain for "a few more days". At the end of April, cryptic posters titled "Music for Cars" appeared in London and Manchester, containing taglines and a Dirty Hit catalogue number, DH00327, amongst a black background. Various billboards were also spotted in the United Kingdom, having used détournement to apply themselves over existing advertisements.

The band updated their website to display a timer counting down towards 1 June at the beginning of May 2018, becoming active again on social media. Within its first hours, it was revealed to contain a hidden zip file with four individual posters, each of the names leading to a hidden page on the website that displayed a conversation between a 'human' and a 'machine'. Over social media, the band frequently released different posters, all titled "A Brief Inquiry Into Online Relationships". On 31 May 2018, the band released the single "Give Yourself a Try", after premiering as Annie Mac's "Hottest Record in the World" on BBC Radio 1 that same day.

The album garnered almost universal praise from critics. According to review aggregator Metacritic, the album has received a weighted score of 83 based on 29 reviews, indicating "universal acclaim". Ryan Dombal of Pitchfork gave the album a score of 8.5, earning it the Best New Music tag, and called it "outrageous and eclectic", as well as "similar to its predecessor in its boundless sense of style, swerving from Afrobeats to brushed-snare jazz balladry to one track that sounds like a trap remix of a Bon Iver ayahuasca trip", but "more purposeful" than I Like It When You Sleep. Time considered it one of the Best Albums of 2018, placing it at number nine on their list.

However, Conrad Duncan writing for the same site gave the album a positive review, calling it "full of genuine heart, intelligence and wit". Popmatters criticised the album as bloated and inconsistent, stating "The band's reach exceeds their grasp here, and vocalist/band leader Matt Healy's indulgences are often more tiresome than charming", while still praising it as "fascinating". Healy, in an interview for Beats 1, stated that "Music for Cars" is more of an era to release music, after renaming Music for Cars to A Brief Inquiry Into Online Relationships. It was released on 30 November 2018. The band headlined both Radio 1's Big Weekend in Stewart Park, Middlesbrough on 26 May 2019 and Reading and Leeds Festival in August 2019.

The album was shortlisted for the 2019 Mercury Music Prize and won the award for British Album of the Year at the 2019 Brit Awards.

2019–2021: Notes on a Conditional Form 
On 24 July 2019, the opening song of Notes on a Conditional Form, titled "The 1975", was released, featuring climate activist Greta Thunberg, the proceeds of the song going to Extinction Rebellion. The lead single, entitled "People" released on 22 August 2019. This was announced by a countdown on the band's social media accounts, including small snippets of lyrics from the song that fans could piece together. A second single, titled "Frail State of Mind", was released on 24 October. The music video for the song was released on 30 November 2019. The next single, "Me & You Together Song", was released on 16 January 2020.

On 15 February, the group did their UK tour that lasted until 3 March 2020. The tour began in Nottingham’s Motor point arena, which holds a capacity of 10,000, and they ended their tour in Dublin after performing in Places such as London’s O2, Manchester, Glasgow and other hit places in the UK. On 17 February 2020, the band put up a "digital detox" website called MindShowerAI which contained a countdown to their next single as well as several odd messages like “I am doing my mind and my life!” and “I feel comfort and respect." A fourth single, ‘The Birthday Party’, was released on 19 February 2020 at the end of the website's countdown. On 3 April, the band released "Jesus Christ 2005 God Bless America", featuring guest vocals from Phoebe Bridgers, which was followed by "If You're Too Shy (Let Me Know)", featuring guest vocals by FKA Twigs, on 23 April 2020.

The band's fourth album, Notes on a Conditional Form, was released on 22 May 2020. It became the band's fourth consecutive album to reach number one on the UK Albums Chart as well as reaching number one in Australia and number four in the United States. On 4 December 2020, the album became certified silver in the UK via Brits certified.

2021–present: Being Funny in a Foreign Language 
Entering 2021, many of the band's 2020 shows that were postponed due to the COVID-19 pandemic were ultimately cancelled on 12 January 2021. During this time, lead singer Matty Healy teased future music under the name "Drive Like I Do", and said that the band was working on their fifth studio album, although there was no indication as to when writing, recording, mixing, etc. would be complete.

In February 2021, another Dirty Hit signed musician called No Rome announced he was working on a track featuring the 1975 along with Charli XCX, which would make it the second No Rome single to feature the band after 2018's "Narcissist". The track's title is "Spinning" and was released on 4 March 2021. An EP that Healy and Daniel produced and co-wrote, Beabadoobee's Our Extended Play, was released in March 2021.

In October 2021, Healy opened for Phoebe Bridgers at the Greek Theatre in Los Angeles on her Reunion Tour. He performed two new songs, one called "New York".

On 14 February 2022, the band deactivated their main social media accounts, hinting at new material. On 1 June 2022, the band's social media accounts were re-activated, and the beginning of a new era was signaled by a series of posts, and updates to the band's official website.

In late June 2022, the first single "Part of the Band" from their fifth album Being Funny in a Foreign Language was teased. Postcards sent to fans revealed an album track listing, while posters of Healy in London promoted the single. The lyrics of "Part of the Band" were posted by Healy on Instagram. The song was released on 7 July 2022. On 14 October 2022, the album was released.

On 1 October 2022, the band appeared on BBC Two's Later... with Jools Holland.

On 7 November 2022, the band performed a sold out show at Madison Square Garden, which was also live-streamed on Amazon Music's Twitch channel. The show—one of the first few in their At Their Very Best tour—was highly acclaimed with some critics praising it for its boldness, while others have stated that the band proved they really were "at their very best."

On 11 March 2023, the band shared "Episode 1", titled “A theatrical performance of an intimate moment,” of a short-film series ahead of their Saturday Night Live performance.

Musical style and influences
The 1975 have been classified as a pop rock band. Scott Kerr of AllMusic wrote that the band combined "the dark and youthful themes of sex, love, and fear with ethereal alt-rock music." Healy specifically cites Talking Heads, My Bloody Valentine, Ride, and Michael Jackson as musical influences; he states that his greatest influence is the oeuvre of filmmaker John Hughes. For their second album, I Like It When You Sleep, for You Are So Beautiful yet So Unaware of It, Healy cited Christina Aguilera, D'Angelo, Roberta Flack, Boards of Canada, and Sigur Rós as inspirations, saying that they're "a post-modern pop band that references a million things. I don't even know what my band is half the time." Their "melancholic" black and white visual aesthetic is juxtaposed with major keys and what the band calls "classic pop sensibilities." Critics at Pitchfork have favourably compared them to the Big Pink. Sex EP was described by Paste as "equal parts ethereal and synth pop", with "haunting" and "smooth" vocals. Their "mellow", stripped down style was praised for its lack of "attention-grabbing production theatrics".

The 1975 has been described as electropop, funk rock, indie pop, indie rock, pop, pop rock and rock. I Like It When You Sleep, for You Are So Beautiful yet So Unaware of It has been described as indie rock and pop.

Healy has stated that their influence is "heavily rooted" in African-American music in many interviews.

Public reaction to the band's music has been mixed, particularly on social media platforms like Twitter, "perhaps the last public space for unfettered music criticism in an increasingly anti-critical landscape", according to Vice magazine's Larry Fitzmaurice in 2016. In an essay on the critical response, he said they have been "the Most Hated and Loved Band in the World" and described "as underrated and overhyped, although the needle has far more often swung towards the former direction". Veteran rock critic Robert Christgau said he thinks "they suck" and should not be called a "rock band" as they do not "rock". In Fitzmaurice's opinion, the band's debut album was mainly a straightforward rock album recorded "with a soft-focus and especially British sensibility", while I Like It When You Sleep was only rock music in the loosest sense of the word. Overall, he said their music is pop "in the realm of Alternative", most comparable to INXS.

Band members

 Matty Healy – lead vocals, rhythm guitar, keyboards
 Adam Hann – lead guitar, keyboards, backing vocals
 Ross MacDonald – bass, keyboards, backing vocals
 George Daniel – drums, keyboards, backing vocals

Current touring musicians
 John Waugh – saxophone, keyboards, backing vocals (2013–present)
 Jamie Squire – keyboards, guitar, backing vocals (2015–present)
 Polly Money – rhythm guitar, keyboards, backing vocals (2022–present)
 Rebekah Rayner – percussion (2022–present)

Former touring musicians
 Taitlyn Jaiy – backing vocals, dancing (2018–2020)
 Kaylee Jaiy – backing vocals, dancing (2018–2020)
 Carly Holt – guest vocals (2022)

Discography

Studio albums 
 The 1975 (2013)
 I Like It When You Sleep, for You Are So Beautiful yet So Unaware of It (2016)
 A Brief Inquiry into Online Relationships (2018)
 Notes on a Conditional Form (2020)
 Being Funny in a Foreign Language (2022)

Awards and nominations

References

External links

 

 
2002 establishments in England
Brit Award winners
English pop rock music groups
English indie rock groups
Interscope Records artists
Musical groups established in 2002
Musical groups from Manchester
Musical quartets
NME Awards winners
Polydor Records artists
Vagrant Records artists
Dirty Hit artists